Daejeon is South Korea's fifth-largest metropolis, with a population of 1.5 million as of 2019. Located in the central-west region of South Korea alongside forested hills and the Geum River, the city is known both for its technology and research institutions, and for celebrating its natural environment, with most mountains, hot springs, and rivers freely open for public use. Daejeon serves as a hub of transportation for major rail and road routes, and is approximately 50 minutes from the capital, Seoul, by KTX or SRT high speed rail.

Daejeon (along with Seoul, Gwacheon and Sejong City) are collectively South Korea's administration hubs. The city is home to 23 universities and colleges, including Korea Advanced Institute of Science and Technology (KAIST) and Chungnam National University, as well as government research institutes, and research and development centers for global companies such as Samsung, LG, mostly located in the city's Daedeok Science Town.

Occupied by humans since the Stone Age, Daejeon was historically a collection of small riverside villages. Though the area had varying degrees of strategic importance depending on the period in history, it was largely undeveloped until its use as a rail hub from the early 1900s, during the period of Japanese occupation. From the 1980s, multiple national administrative functions were moved from Seoul to Daejeon, most of which are now located in the Daejeon Government Complex, resulting in another population increase. The city hosted the 1986 Asian Games, the Taejon Expo '93, the International Mathematical Olympiads in 2000, and was elevated to the status of Metropolitan City in 2005.

Daejeon is situated in a lowland valley with three major rivers eventually flowing into the Yellow Sea by way of the Geum river. Daejeon experiences a monsoon-influenced, four-season climate with wet, hot summers and drier, cold winters.

History
Human beings first settled in the Daejeon region during the Stone Age. It was occupied and in use as strategic military ground in various times by people such as the Usul-gun of Baekje, Bipung-gun of Silla, and the Hoideok-hyeon, Yuseong-hyeon, Deokjin-hyeon, and Jinjam-hyeon. During the Joseon Kingdom period, it remained occupied by the Hoideok-hyeon and Jinjam-hyeon of Gongju Mokha. In 1895, most of the area was made part of Hoideok-gun and Jinjam-gun, excluding some parts that belonged to Gongju-gun.

The Daejeon area was historically known as Hanbat (한밭), a native Korean term for "large field", during the Joseon Dynasty. "Daejeon" simply means the same thing in Hanja. In the 19th century, Daejeon was also known in English as Kung-tsiou.

Historically, Daejeon was a small village without many residents. However, in 1905, the Gyeongbu Railway began operations from Seoul to Busan, opening a station at Daejeon. In 1926 under the rule of the Japanese government, the Honam Railway was built between Mokpo and Daejeon, transforming the latter into a major transportation hub. Because of its location and proximity to means of transportation, Daejeon grew quickly.

As railroads were laid under Japanese rule, an environment friendly to the Japanese was created, and many Japanese began to settle in Daejeon taking advantage of the opportunity. According to 1910 census data, 58%, or more than half of the 4,350 Daejeon population at the time, were Japanese. In 1925, 56% of the 8,861 people in Daejeon were Japanese. Therefore, Daejeon was one of the cities with great cultural influence of Japanese residents. For example, elderly people who experienced Japanese colonial era pronounce '단무지' (Pickled radish, danmuji) as '닥광/단광'(dakgwang/dangwang), '컵' (cup, keob) as '고뿌' (goffu) and '비닐' (vinyl, binil) as '비니루' (binilu). In addition, '우에시다리' (Uesidari), a representative team division game in Daejeon, was also created at this time and is believed to have been derived from the Japanese word '上(うえ, Ue)' meaning 'up' and the Japanese word '下(した, sita)' meaning 'down'.

In 1932, the capital of Chungnam province was moved from Gongju to Daejeon. During the Korean War, the city was the site of an early major conflict: the Battle of Taejon. Also during the war, the mass graves of civilians killed by South Korean police were discovered near Taejon and reported on by Alan Winnington in his famous anti-war leaflet "I Saw Truth in Korea". Embarrassed by the contents of the leaflet, the British government considered having him executed for treason, though instead decided to make him stateless.

Since then, changes have been made to the city's boundaries. Its official names have evolved, as well. Among the boundary modifications include one that effectively made the nearby town of Daedeok a part of the city in 1983. Then, in the late 1980s, Daejeon was elevated to the status of Special City (Jikhalsi), thus became a separate administrative region from Chungcheongnam-do. In 1995, all South Korean Special Cities were again renamed as Metropolitan Cities, which is reflected in the current official name of Daejeon, Daejeon Metropolitan City (대전광역시).

In the 1980s, the Korean administration began moving various national government operations from Seoul to Daejeon, eventually opening the Daejeon Government Complex in 1997. Today, the national government offices in Daejeon include Korea Customs Service, Small and Medium Business Administration, Public Procurement Service, National Statistical Office, Military Manpower Administration, Korea Forest Service, Cultural Heritage Administration, Korean Intellectual Property Office, Korail, Korea Water Resources Corporation, Korea Minting and Security Printing Corporation and Patent Court of Korea.

The population of Daejeon increased dramatically as a result of the government center. However, with the construction of Sejong Special Self-Governing City in 2013 for the division of capital functions and balanced local development, many of the public institutions that had previously headed to Daejeon were moved to Sejong, and many public institutions in Seoul were also moved to Sejong. With the launch of Sejong City, large-scale development began, resulting in infrastructure construction and large-scale apartment complexes. Sejong is located immediately north of Daejeon, and Daejeon citizens began to outflow to Sejong. As of July 2020, there was net outflow of more than 100,000 people from Daejeon to Sejong.

Geography

Daejeon lies between latitudes N36°10'59" and N36°30'1" and longitudes E127°14'48" and E127°33'35" near the middle of South Korea.

Known historically as 'big field,' the city lies inside a great circle surrounded by several mountains, with Gyeryongsan National Park straddling the city border on the west, and the foot of the Sobaek Mountain range just beyond the city to the south and east. Three rivers run through the center of the city: Gapcheon (갑천), Yudeungcheon (유등천), and Daejeoncheon (대전천). These flow roughly from south to north, eventually joining the Geum River which borders the city on the northeast. The river changes direction after leaving Daejeon, turning to the southwest and eventually emptying into the Yellow Sea near Gunsan.

Climate

Daejeon has a monsoon-influenced, four-season climate that lies between the humid subtropical and humid continental climatic classifications (Köppen Cwa/Dwa, respectively), with slightly more mild temperature extremes compared with Seoul. The heaviest rainfall during the year typically occurs from July through August during the Korean monsoon season.

Administrative divisions

Daejeon is divided into five political "gu" or "districts": Seogu (서구), Donggu (동구), Yuseonggu (유성구), Daedeokgu (대덕구), and Junggu (중구).

Demographics 

As of January 2022, Daejeon has a population of 1,469,543, including 17,292 (1.2%) registered residents of foreign nationality.

Religion 

According to the census of 2005, of the people of Daejeon, 21.8% follow Buddhism and 31.2% follow Christianity (20.5% Protestantism and 10.7% Catholicism). About 47% of the population is mostly not religious or follows Muism and other indigenous religions.

Education

There are 23 universities and colleges in Daejeon, concurrently enrolling around 90,000 students and employing 4,000 professors.

Major public universities in Daejeon include:

 Chungnam National University, a major national university established for the South Chungcheong province. Chungnam National University brings expertise in biotechnology, medicine, and the agricultural sciences.
 Daejeon Chungnam University, a campus in the four-year Korea National Open University system.
 Hanbat National University, founded in 1927, specializing in partnerships between industry and academia.
 Korea Advanced Institute of Science and Technology (KAIST), the nation's first public research-oriented science and engineering institution. The university was ranked as the best Asian science and technology school by Asiaweek in 2000. Strong fields at KAIST include computer science, electrical and nuclear engineering, mechanical design, chemistry, and telecommunications.

Major private universities in Daejeon include:

 Mokwon University 
 Pai Chai University, founded in 1885, one of the oldest private universities in South Korea.
 Woosong University, specialized curriculum based on international exchange, foreign-language, and IT education.
 Hannam University, founded in 1956 by Christian missionaries, with a main campus in O-Jeong Dong (site of the historic Missionary Village), and a branch campus is in Techno Valley.

Specialized high schools and academies include: 

 Daejeon Foreign Language High School is a selective high school focusing on teaching of foreign language. The school provides language education of 7 majors including English, German, French, Spanish, Chinese, Japanese, and Russian.
 Daejeon Science High School is a selective high school focused on teaching science. 
 Taejon Christian International School is an international school in the city.

Research and development

Daedeok Innopolis in Yuseong District houses various national/corporate facilities.

 National Science Museum
 Government research institutes like IITA and ETRI
 National universities like KAIST, Chungnam National University, and UST
 Government-invested corporate research institutes
 R&D centers of Samsung and LG Corporation. 
 Venture companies

Researchers and businessmen work in the fields of telecommunications, nanofabrication, biotechnology, water, nuclear and hydro power, nuclear fusion, design, measurement technologies, mechanical engineering, fuel cells, aeronautics, new materials, robotics, new drugs, and environmental technologies. Daedeok Innopolis' membership includes 898 corporations, 35 government-invested and sponsored institutions; six universities, and 15 public organizations.Research institutes in Daedeok include the Korea Research Institute of Bioscience and Biotechnology (KRIBB), the Korea Atomic Energy Research Institute (KAERI), Electronic and Telecommunications Research Institute (ETRI), Korea Aerospace Research Institute (KARI), Korea Astronomy and Space Science Institute (KASI), Korea Fusion Energy Research Institute (KFERI), National Nanofab Center, Korea Basic Science Institute (KBSI), Institute for Basic Science (IBS), Korea Institute of Machinery and Materials (KIMM), Korea Research Institute of Chemical Technology (KRICT), Korea Institute of Science and Technology Information (KISTI), Korea Research Institute of Standards and Science (KRISS), Marine and Ocean Engineering Research Institute, Institute of Information Technology Advancement (IITA), Korea Institute of Geosciences and Mineral Resources, Agency for Defense Development (ADD), Korea Institute of Toxicology (KIT), Korea Institute of Oriental Medicine, Korea Institute of Nuclear Non-proliferation and Control, National Institute for Mathematical Sciences (NIMS), Korea Institute of Nuclear Safety (KINS), Rare Isotope Science Project (RISP), National Research Foundation of Korea (NRF), and the National Security Research Institute. Among the technology produced in Daedeok are ETRI's wireless communications systems CDMA, WIBRO, and DMB, KRIBB's nano biochips, KARI's KOMPSAT satellites, and NFRI's KSTAR nuclear fusion experimental reactor.

Daedeok is also home to 21 corporate research centers with global reach surrounded by an equal number of smaller firms. Some of the notable corporate research centers are Dongbu Advanced Research Institute (biotechnology, microorganisms and agrichemicals), GS-Caltex Value Creation Center (environmentally friendly products including substitutes for oil), Hanwha Chemical Research (biotechnology, electronics materials, catalysts, and nanotechnology), Honam Petrochemical Daeduk Research Institute (synthetic chemistry and petrochemicals), LG Chemical LTD. Research Park (lithium ion battery and polymer battery development), Samyang R&D Center (medical research and electronics), and SK Institute of Technology (petroleum-related research).

Public corporation research institutes such as Korea Electric Power Research Institute (hydroelectric projects and nuclear energy), Korea Institute of Construction Materials (authorized test agency for construction materials), and Korea Institute of Aerospace Technology (aerospace design, satellites, launch technologies) are also part of the Daedeok system.

On 16 May 2013, Daejeon was selected as the core of the International Science and Business Belt. 

Besides a tire production facility, Hankook Tire has its main R&D centre in Daejeon.

Arts and culture

Museums and arts centers 

Daejeon is the home of multiple arts and culture complexes, mostly centered around the Daedeok area. These include:

 Daejeon Museum of Art which hosts primarily technology-oriented modern and contemporary exhibitions
 Daejeon Arts Center which is home to local music and theater groups including the Daejeon Philharmonic Orchestra
 Laurent Beaudouin-designed Lee Ungno Museum, a large permanent collection of works by or related to the prominent Korean artist Lee Ungno
 Expo Science Park, built on the grounds of the former international exposition (Taejŏn Expo '93) is home to the Institute for Basic Science and the National Science Museum, Korea's flagship science museum which features a main exhibition hall highlighting harmony between nature, man, and technology, as well as dedicated buildings related to natural history, future technology, biosphere, a children's science museum, and an astronomical observatory. 
 Geological Museum, belonging to the Korea Institute of Geoscience and Mineral Resources
 Daejeon Citizen's Observatory which houses a 10-inch refracting telescope and is the first citizen observatory in Korea

Other arts spaces in the city include the six-floor Daejeon Artist House, performing arts center, and the Natural Ecology Center at Daecheong Lake.

Parks and nature 
Daejeon citizens are recognized for their fondness of nature, with most mountains, hot springs, and rivers freely open for public use. Many of the city's modern-day traditions, festivals, attractions, and industries are linked in some way to important mountains, rivers, and forests. There are eight 'beautiful sights' designated by city government, including the mountains Sikjangsan, Bomunsan, Gubongsan, Jangtaesan, and Gyejoksan, the lake Daecheonghosu, as well as Yuseong Foot Spa, and Expo Science Park, which includes landmarks such as the Hanbit Tower and Expo Bridge. The Daejeon Hanbat Arboretum, built on the former parking lots of the World Expo, also holds the distinction of being the largest manmade arboretum in Korea. Overlooking Daejeon from the south, Bomunsan Mountain park includes water springs, trails, viewpoints, Buddhist temples, a nature healing center, outdoor concert hall, and Daejeon O-World, a theme park which includes Daejeon Zoo, Joy Land, and Flower Land. The park is home to 160 species of 600 animals, 17 rides and themed gardens including Sounds garden, Herb Garden, and Rose Garden.

Media
Daejeon is a provincial center for the television, newspaper and publishing industries. Major television broadcasting companies, such as KBS and MBC, have branches in Daejeon; Taejon Broadcasting Corporation (TJB) is a local television broadcaster based in Daejeon. Cable TV services are available in most apartments. Eight (8) channels of Mobile TV are provided with the digital radio channels. Several FM radio stations provide news and music on the air. KBS, MBC, TJB have their FM radio channels, there are Christian radio channels, FEBC and CBS, and traffic news channel TBN. Daejeon Ilbo is the major local newspaper which covers South Chungcheong province.

Festivals 
Daejeon Science Festival, which symbolizes the science city of Daejeon, is a representative festival. Other yearly festivals include The Hyo Culture Root Festival, Daejeon International Wine Fair, Yuseong Oncheon Festival, Geumgang Rojas Festival, Diku Festival, Gyejoksan Mountain Manbal Festival and Gyeonwoojik Women Festival.

Sports

Daejeon is home to multiple professional teams and national and internationally active sports facilities. The Daejeon World Cup Stadium was constructed for the 2002 FIFA World Cup, hosting several games including the South Korea vs. Italy match in the round of 16. The facility is now the home of the city's football club. The Daejeon Hanbat Sports Complex was built in 1964, and was one of the host sites of the 1986 Asian Games, and also hosted preliminaries during the 1988 Olympic Games in Seoul. Today, with several of the facilities renovated, it hosts the city's professional baseball, K3 League football, and volleyball teams. The city is also home to LPGA golfers Pak Se-ri and Jang Jeong, and is the hometown of former New York Mets left-handed reliever Dae-sung Koo.

Football 
The city is home to the K League 1 football club Daejeon Hana Citizen, playing home games at Daejeon World Cup Stadium, and the K3 League side Daejeon Korail, which plays home games at Daejeon Hanbat Sports Complex.

Baseball 

The Hanwha Eagles of the KBO League were founded in Daejeon in 1985. They play home games at the Daejeon Hanbat Baseball Stadium, built in Busa-dong in 1964, with an iconic view of Bomunsan mountain in the outfield. The stadium was renovated and expanded in 2013, moving the outfield wall and expanding seating to 13,000.

Volleyball 
The V-League men's volleyball club Daejeon Samsung Fire Bluefangs and the V-League women's volleyball club Daejeon KGC both play their home games at the Chungmu Gymnasium of the Daejeon Hanbat Sports Complex.

Transportation

Daejeon is a center of transportation in South Korea, where two major expressways, Gyeongbu Expressway and Honam Expressway Branch, and two major railway lines, Gyeongbu railway and Honam railway, are joined. Travel time between Daejeon and Seoul using the KTX high-speed rail system is about 50 minutes. The nearest airport to Daejeon is Cheongju Airport, about a thirty-minute drive north of Daejeon. However, there are also direct bus connections to Incheon International Airport.

Subway

One line, Daejeon Subway Line 1, of a planned five-line subway system has been operating since 17 April 2007 (partial operations on this line began on 16 March 2006). This subway line connects Daejeon Station, located in the original city center, with the more modern and more recently developed sections of this city, including Dunsan, where the city hall and a number of national government buildings are located.

Notable differences between the Daejeon subway and the Seoul subway include narrower cars, no doors connecting cars, four cars per train rather than ten, and storage space under the seats for use by passengers. Originally, plastic tokens for toll were read by a proximity sensor when entering the turnstiles, and then inserted into a slot when exiting. The design of the tokens allowed them to be used for advertising. The system now employs the T-money system, a rechargeable series of Smart cards and other "smart" devices used for paying transportation fares. Platform screen doors are installed in the subway stations.

Cycling 
The name of the public bicycle in Korea is different for each region, and the name of the public bicycle in Daejeon is '타슈(Tashu)'. '타슈(Tashu) is a name created using the Chungcheong dialect, and if you change it to the standard language, it becomes '타세요(Taseyo)'. Tashu is an unmanned rental public bicycle service operated in Daejeon Metropolitan City since 2008, and the basic rental fee is 500 won, and if you rent a daily ticket, you can use it unlimitedly within an hour on that day. In other words, if you return it within an hour of rental, you can re-rent it for free immediately after returning it and use it for another hour. However, if it exceeds one hour at a time, it will be automatically charged, so be careful. The rental time is from 5 a.m. to 0 a.m., and rental is not possible from 0 a.m. to 5 a.m., and only return is possible. The name '타슈(Tashu)' is considered a good example of branding because it is a good name for anyone in the world to pronounce while maintaining their local identity.

Gallery

Notable people 

 An Yu-jin, singer (Iz*One, Ive)
 Kim Joon-ho, comedian
 Do Ji-han, actor
 Choi Sung-bong, singer
 Chung Eun-yong, policeman and activist
 Han Eun-jung, actress
 Yoon Joo-hee, actress
 Han Sang-hyuk, singer (VIXX)
 Hong Jin-ho, television personality and former professional StarCraft player 
 Ivy, singer and musical actress
 Kwon Sang-woo, actor
 Lee Na-eun, singer and actress (April), born in Cheongju (청주). She moved to Daejeon before entering elementary school.
 Lee Yoon-ki, film director
 Lim Choong-hyun, footballer 
 Rhie Won-bok, cartoonist
 Pak Se-ri, former professional golfer
 Joon Park, artist
 Ryu Su-jeong, singer (Lovelyz)
 Shin Chaeho, independence activist, historian, anarchist, nationalist and the founder of Korean ethnic nationalist historiography
 Shin Seung-hun, singer-songwriter
 Song Joong-ki, actor
 Chen, singer, dancer, model and member of (EXO, EXO-CBX)
 Kyu Ha Kim, judoka
 Baek Ye-rin, singer (15&)
 Park Ji-min, singer (15&)
 Jo Bo-ah, actress, model and host
 Park Eun-ooh, singer-songwriter, music producer, vocalist and lyricist
 Son Suk-ku, actor 
 Choi Jung-in, singer
 Kim Woo-seok, singer (X1, Up10tion) and actor
 FlaSh, StarCraft: Brood War and StarCraft II player
 Paul Sun-Hyung Lee, actor
 Kim Dong-hyun, singer (AB6IX)
 Yeo One, singer (Pentagon) and actor
 Kwak Dong-yeon, actor 
 Lee Hae-in, figure skater

Twin towns – sister cities

See also 

 List of cities in South Korea

References

Citations

Bibliography 
 .

External links 

  
 Daejeon: Official site of Korea Tourism Org. (archived)

 
Special Cities and Metropolitan Cities of South Korea